Pika pika or pikapika may refer to:

Music
 "Pika Pika" (Steve Aoki song), a 2018 song by Steve Aoki, see Steve Aoki discography
 "Pika Pika", a 1999 song by Makoto Kawamoto

Characters
 Pikachu, a Pokémon who speaks only one word, pikachu, frequently clipped to pika and as a doublet pikapika
 Pikapika, a fictional character from Samurai Pizza Cats, see List of Samurai Pizza Cats characters

Other uses
 Pika (subgenus), a subgenus of the genus Ochotona, aka the Pika pika

See also
 Pika (disambiguation)
 Pika Pika Fantajin, 2014 album by Kyary Pamyu Pamyu
 Pica pica, a bird species
 DJ Pica Pica Pica, a Japanese DJ
 Pica (disambiguation)
 PICA (disambiguation)